Barbara Love Adrian (1931–2014) was an American artist.

Life
Adrian graduated from Hunter College, and Columbia University. From 1968 to 2011, she taught at the Art Students League of New York.

In 1972, Adrian married Franklin Creighton Tramutola.

Exhibitions
 1966 Banfer Gallery
 1975 An American dream world: romantic realism, 1930–1955 Whitney Museum of American Art, New York City, NY

References

1931 births
2014 deaths
Place of birth missing
Hunter College alumni
Columbia University alumni
20th-century American painters